Lirmanjan (also Romanized as Līrmanjān; also known as Līrmanjān-e Kām Fīrūz) is a village in Khorram Makan Rural District, Kamfiruz District, Marvdasht County, Fars Province, Iran. At the 2006 census, its population was 1,037, in 192 families.

References 

Populated places in Marvdasht County